Fallout: Equestria is a post-apocalyptic fan fiction novel based on the Fallout and My Little Pony: Friendship is Magic series. It was originally published by pseudonymous user Kkat on April 12, 2011. It is split into five volumes, totalling 620,000 words across more than 2,000 pages. The novel has been published as an e-novel, an audionovel, and also as a physical hardcover novel. The novel is considered to be one of the most popular My Little Pony: Friendship Is Magic fanworks, having developed a large following of its own.

Synopsis 
The series is a transformative fanwork, based on the Fallout video game franchise and the animated series My Little Pony: Friendship Is Magic. Fallout: Equestria places the magical ponies of the Friendship Is Magic franchise within the post-apocalyptic setting of the Fallout games. In the novel, the fictional world of Equestria enters a resource war with the Zebra Empire. The resulting conflict leaves both continents as mutant-filled wastelands, with survivors living in underground fallout shelters called "Stables". Within this setting, the novel combines various cyberpunk, atompunk and retrofuturistic elements with the fantasy elements of Friendship Is Magic. The incorporation of more violent and mature content contributes to a darker overall tone than the Friendship Is Magic source material.

The protagonist, Littlepip, lives in Stable 2, alongside Velvet Remedy, a popular singer. When Velvet suddenly leaves, Littlepip leaves to track her down and discovers the post-war world outside ravaged by raiders, monsters, and other dangers. She eventually meets Watcher, a faceless voice who speaks to her by controlling radio robots known as Sprite Bots. He leads her to the raider infested ruins of the Ponyville library to find the Wasteland Survival guide, written by a local ghoul, and instructs her to find a virtue to stick to as she travels to guide her onward.

As she begins traveling, she eventually reunites with Velvet, alongside a pegasus named Deadshot Calamity, who was exiled from the Pegasus Enclave who live above the clouds and forbid citizens from flying to the surface, and Pyrelight, a radioactive phoenix. She eventually meets Gawdyna Grimfeathers, a gryphon leading a mercenary group called The Talons, who enlists their help to free an ex-labor camp from the control of Mister Topaz, who turns out to be a massive dragon feeding on the gems mined in the prison.

Along their way, they repeatedly cross paths with Alicorns, mutated ponies with a wide array of magical powers which they can tap into through their hivemind. Littlepip struggles to defeat them early on as the Alicorns are able to collectively learn from their mistakes, until she meets Steelhooves, a ghoulified member of a pre-war soldifer faction called the Steel Rangers fused to his power armor.

Littlepip also slowly begins to uncover the stories of the Ministry Mares, the six main characters of My Little Pony who headed their own ministries as the war with the zebras escalated (The Ministry of Morale, Ministry of Arcane Sciences, Ministry of Wartime Technology, Ministry of Image, Ministry of Awesome, and Ministry of Peace), who all ended up dead as their attempts to end the war led to the creation of the Steel Rangers, the Megaspells that ended Equestria, and the Pegasus Enclave. One of the only survivors is the dragon Spike, who is revealed to be the mysterious Watcher, operating from the cave he slept through the war in and has resided in for over 200 years trying to find bearers of the Elements of Harmony the Ministry Mares once held, magical artifacts he intends to use to purge the wastelands of radioactivity through a powerful terraforming megaspell called the Gardens of Equestria.

Littlepip eventually learns of the two greatest threats the Wasteland faces, being Red Eye, a charismatic cyborg earth pony who intends to rebuild civilization through slavery, and the Goddess, a unicorn formerly known as Trixie, now a monstrous failed experiment of Twilight Sparkle who continues to create the race of Alicorns and hopes to assimilate the entire Wasteland into her psychic hivemind. To get close to Red Eye, Littlepip allows herself to be enslaved, and is taken to the slaver city of Fillydelphia where she meets a zebra slave named Xenith. After Littlepip rescues her from a gladiatorial arena, Xenith joins up with the rest of the party.

Littlepip finally devises a plan to kill The Goddess, planting a Megaspell under her lair and stalling her with her own memories removed of the plan to keep The Goddess from learning it psychically. Unfortunately, when the Megaspell begins its countdown, the Pegasus Enclave approaches The Goddess, first intending to side with her, and later falsely takes credit for her demise. Following The Goddesses death, Steelhooves is killed in combat, and the Enclave mounts a fullscale invasion of the surface, with many settlements fighting back.

As the surface goes to war with the Enclave, Red Eye lures Littlepip to his base, a church in the Everfree Forest where he reveals his plan to merge his soul with Littlepip and Autumn Leaf, a tactically minded general of the Enclave, using their virtues to become a new Goddess the Wasteland can worship. Littlepip refuses him, claiming the citizens of the Wasteland don't need a goddess, and kills both of them in the chaos as one of the Enclave Battleships approaching the Everfree is shot down.

Littlepip regroups everyone in Spike's cave, including The Talons and the duo of Lion and Mouse, a ghoul and a transformed dragon respectively, and other companions she met on her travels, as she reveals her plan; Before the war, the Ministry of Awesome created the Single Pegasus Project, a series of towers able to control weather across all of Equestria for wartime usage. Littlepip plans to control it herself to strip away the cloud layer and break the power of the Enclave, ending the war.

As the final battle between Red Eye's slavers and the Enclave reaches its boiling point, Littlepip's allies cast a powerful megaspell, utilizing the power of the sun to destroy major weaponry on both sides and reduce casualties. When she enters the Single Pegasus Project, she finds the soul of Princess Celestia inside, trapped and unable to control the machine after uploading herself into it to try and stop the initial megaspell devastation of the war. Littlepip promises to stay by her side and seals herself in the SPP, destroying the cloud layer and ending the battle.

In the epilogue, it is revealed that the Elements of Harmony were eventually inherited by Littlepip's friends, with Littlepip acting as a 'spark' which brought the elements together. Her friends used the Gardens to create a new age for Equestria, allowing the wasteland to finally heal and unite under a new government called the New Canterlot Republic.

Reception and influence 
The novel is considered to be a major cornerstone of the My Little Pony: Friendship Is Magic fandom, due to its scale and popularity. This has been reflected in the immense amount of fanworks undertaken since 2012, ranging from the music and fanart category, to spin-offs/non-canon side stories, and concluding with the production of a video game developed by The Overmare Studios, titled Ashes of Equestria (having previously been considered a mod, but eventually becoming a stand-alone project, which is still in production. It uses a modified version of the 3D graphic engine Unity; however, there has been some confusion regarding it, as it looks similar to the Gamebryo engine used for Fallout 3, a game developed by Bethesda Game Studios).

Fallout: Equestria was the theme of the 2017 Trotcon, a convention based on the show in Columbus, Ohio. As of 2012, the novel has been translated in seven languages, and had inspired fanworks and fanart. Despite the popularity of Fallout: Equestria, the novel's author has remained anonymous, choosing not to reveal their real name or gender.

References 

Fallout (series)
Fan fiction works
My Little Pony fandom
My Little Pony: Friendship Is Magic
Dieselpunk
Post-apocalyptic literature
Works published anonymously
Works published under a pseudonym